Erechthias flavistriata, the sugarcane bud moth, is a moth of the family Tineidae. It was described by Lord Walsingham in 1907 from Hawaii, but is probably an introduced species. It is found in large parts of the Pacific Rim including the Marquesas, Rapa Iti, Fiji, the New Hebrides, the Kermadec Islands, the Solomons, Java and Malaya. It has been spread widely by man and probably has travelled to many islands throughout much of the Pacific in the canoes of the native peoples.

Description
The wingspan is about 12 mm. Adults have a pale yellowish-white or greyish-white color with a few yellower streaks and numerous black or brown dots on the wings.

Biology
Larvae have been recorded feeding on banana, coconut and other palms, Pandanus species, pineapple and sugarcane. The full-grown larva is about 12 to 15 mm.

The larvae are found beneath the leaf-sheaths of the older leaves which are partially or completely dead and dried. The larvae create a silken web by which they partially conceal themselves. They are most abundant where no stripping has been done or where there is more or less of a tangled mass of leaves. They normally feed upon the dried leaf-sheaths themselves, also on the leaves. On the sheath they feed on the inner side towards the cane stalk, eating out between the strands of fibers, often burrowing into the substance of the leaf-sheath. Besides their normal feeding, however, they often eat off the surface of the rind for considerable areas, particularly at or just above the nodes and sometimes eat off the surface from the whole internode. The worst damage however, is done when they eat out the buds or "eyes" which they sometimes do for several in succession, or for from one to three feet of the cane stalk. The eating of the "eyes" is a serious injury, creating an opportunity for the admission of fungus spores and rendering the cane valueless for usage as a seed.

The pupa is 5.5–6 mm and very pale yellowish brown. The pupa is formed within a cocoon made in the same location in which the larva has been feeding. It is 6–10 mm long and usually has an outer layer of fibrous material from the leaf-sheath where the larva fed. Adults emerge in about two or three weeks.

References

External links

Erechthiinae
Fauna of Seychelles
Moths described in 1907
Moths of New Zealand